This is a list of active and extinct volcanoes in Panama.

See also
 Central America Volcanic Arc
 List of volcanoes in Costa Rica

References

Panama
 
Volcanoes